Luding Bridge is a bridge over the Dadu River in Luding County, Garzê Tibetan Autonomous Prefecture, Sichuan, China, located about 80 kilometers west of the city of Ya'an. The bridge dates from the Qing Dynasty and is considered a historical landmark. It was an important crossing on the road between Sichuan and Tibet. The bridge was the location of the Battle of Luding Bridge, one of the most important events in the Long March.

Battle of Luding Bridge

In 1935, during the Long March, soldiers of the Fourth Regiment of the Chinese Workers and Peasants' Army secured the bridge as a river crossing vital to the Red Army.

See also
 Luding Yaye Expressway Bridge
 List of bridges in China

References

External links

Garzê Tibetan Autonomous Prefecture
Pedestrian bridges in China
Suspension bridges in China
Bridges completed in 1701
1701 establishments in Asia
Major National Historical and Cultural Sites in Sichuan